William Thomas Minor (October 3, 1815 –  October 13, 1889) was an American judge and politician from Connecticut. He served as the 39th Governor of Connecticut, Consul-General to Havana, Cuba and judge on the Connecticut Superior Court.

Biography
Minor was born in Stamford, Connecticut, on October 3, 1815 to Simeon Hinman Minor and Catherine Lockwood Minor. He studied at Yale University and graduated in 1834. Minor taught school for five years while he studied law under his father, Simeon Minor, a former Connecticut legislator.

Career
In 1840, Minor was admitted to the bar and began the practice of law in Stamford. Minor became a member of the Connecticut House of Representatives in 1841, and served in that position until 1848. He was a judge for the Fairfield County, Connecticut Court. He married Mary Catherine Leeds on April 16, 1849, and they had five children. He became a member of the Connecticut State Senate representing the 12th District in 1854.

As candidate of the American Party, Minor was elected Governor of Connecticut in 1855 over Samuel Ingham by the Connecticut General Assembly by a 177 to 70 vote. He was re-elected to a second term in 1856 by the Connecticut General Assembly, again over Ingham, by a vote of 135 to 116.  While Governor, Minor was a supporter of lengthening the period of residency before naturalization. He also supported the dismissal of six military companies that consisted mostly of Irishmen. This step further enraged immigrants. Legislation was passed that deprived suffrage to men unable to read the state constitution. He supported better schools in Connecticut and held the belief that the schools should be free for all the children in the state. He also supported the antislavery measures of the Republicans. He was not a candidate for the governorship in the election of April 1857, and left office on May 6, 1857.

In 1864, Minor was a delegate from Connecticut to the Republican National Convention, which assembled at Baltimore in June of that year. He voted with his delegation for Abraham Lincoln for President and Andrew Johnson for Vice-President of the United States. 
In July 1864, Minor was appointed by Lincoln as Consul-General to Havana, Cuba. Three years later he returned to Connecticut and spent one year as a member of the Connecticut House of Representatives. In 1868, he was appointed judge on the Connecticut Superior Court, and served in that position until 1873 when he resigned his judgeship and returned to his private law practice. He also served on the 1879 commission that reconciled an extended boundary argument with New York.

Death
Minor died on October 13, 1889, in Stamford. He is interred at Woodland Cemetery, Stamford, Fairfield County, Connecticut.

References

Further reading
 Sobel, Robert and John Raimo. Biographical Directory of the Governors of the United States, 1789-1978. Greenwood Press, 1988.

External links
 

Connecticut State Library
Connecticut State Library
National Governors Association
The Political Graveyard
Ancestry.com

1815 births
1889 deaths
Connecticut Know Nothings
Connecticut state court judges
Republican Party Connecticut state senators
Republican Party governors of Connecticut
Know-Nothing state governors of the United States
19th-century American politicians
Republican Party members of the Connecticut House of Representatives
Politicians from Stamford, Connecticut
Yale University alumni
19th-century American judges